Claverley is a civil parish in Shropshire, England.  It contains 61 listed buildings that are recorded in the National Heritage List for England.  Of these, two are listed at Grade I, the highest of the three grades, three are at Grade II*, the middle grade, and the others are at Grade II, the lowest grade.  The parish contains the village of Claverley and smaller settlements, including Beobridge, but is otherwise entirely rural.  Most of the listed buildings are houses, cottages, farmhouses and farm buildings, many of which are timber framed and date from the 14th to the 17th century.  The other listed buildings include a church and items in the churchyard, country houses and associated structures, public houses, and a school.


Key

Buildings

References

Citations

Sources

Lists of buildings and structures in Shropshire